Rosie Galligan (born 30 April 1998) is an English rugby union player. She is a member of the England women's national rugby union team and plays for Harlequins at club level.

International career
After playing for England U20s in 2017/18 and 2018/19, Galligan's full England debut came off the bench against Ireland in the 2019 Six Nations. Her international career was interrupted by a bout of meningitis in September 2019 followed by a serious injury in January 2020 when a fall in a line-out caused a broken leg and ankle along with three ruptured ligaments, so her second cap did not come until the 2022 Six Nations match against Scotland.

In September 2022 Galligan was named in the England squad for the COVID-delayed 2021 Rugby World Cup.

Club career 
Galligan joined Premier 15s team Saracens for the 2016/17 season, breaking into their first team the following year, and helped them to two Premier 15 titles.

She signed for Harlequins in June 2021.

Early life and education 
Galligan grew up in Kent where she developed an interest in rugby after being involved in a touch tournament and went on to play for Aylesford Bulls. She represented Kent at age group level in rugby, hockey and cricket.

References 

Living people
1998 births
England women's international rugby union players
English female rugby union players
21st-century English women